Carl Meyer (born 27 May 1991) is a South African rugby union player who currently plays as a fullback for NOLA Gold in Major League Rugby (MLR).

Professional rugby career

Meyer made his debut for the Dragons regional team in 2014 having previously played for Ebbw Vale RFC. He was released by the Dragons at the end of the 2017-18 season.

References

External links 
Dragons profile

South African rugby union players
Dragons RFC players
Living people
1991 births
Place of birth missing (living people)
Ebbw Vale RFC players
Rugby union fullbacks
Rugby union wings
Rugby union centres
New Orleans Gold players
Rugby union players from Pietermaritzburg